The Papua New Guinea women's national 3x3 team is a national basketball team of Papua New Guinea. It is managed by the Basketball Federation of Papua New Guinea (BFPNG) and represents the country in international 3x3 basketball competitions, including at the Pacific Games. The team won a silver medal at the 2017 Pacific Mini Games.

See also 
 Papua New Guinea women's national basketball team
 Papua New Guinea women's national under-19 basketball team

References

External links
Basketball Federation of Papua New Guinea - facebook presentation

Women's national 3x3 basketball teams
Basketball in Papua New Guinea
Basketball teams in Papua New Guinea
National sports teams of Papua New Guinea